The Paris Independent Film Festival is an annual film festival showcasing international independent films that takes place in Paris, France. It features a competition and awards films in various categories. It has a special emphasis on films that have no distribution yet, but also screens other films out of competition.

About 

The festival was founded in 2015 and takes place at the Reflet Médicis theatre in Paris. It showcases short and feature films of any genre, from narrative to documentary. An international jury selects and awards the presented films. The festival showcases previews, world premieres as well as films that already screened at other festivals. Many filmmakers attend the screenings of their films, and past attendants included Alexis Krasilovsky and Ira Schneider.

Notable films in competition 

 2015: Ira Schneider premiered a new re-edit of his film A Weekend at the Beach with Jean-Luc Godard.
 2015: Art!, a short film starring Helmut Berger and Zachi Noy, had its world premiere at the festival.
 2015: Chasing Bonnie & Clyde, a documentary that was financed partially through a crowd-funding campaign, had an exclusive preview at the festival.

References

External links

 Official Facebook-Site of the festival.

Film festivals in Paris
Annual events in Paris